The 2002–03 Tampa Bay Lightning season was the 11th National Hockey League (NHL) season in Tampa, Florida. The Lightning made it back to the Stanley Cup playoffs for the first time since 1996.

Regular season

Final standings

Playoffs

Schedule and results

Regular season

|- align="center" bgcolor="#CCFFCC" 
|1||W||October 10, 2002||4–3 OT|| align="left"| @ Florida Panthers (2002–03) ||1–0–0–0 || 
|- align="center" bgcolor="#CCFFCC" 
|2||W||October 12, 2002||5–1 || align="left"|  Carolina Hurricanes (2002–03) ||2–0–0–0 || 
|- align="center" bgcolor="#CCFFCC" 
|3||W||October 18, 2002||8–5 || align="left"|  Atlanta Thrashers (2002–03) ||3–0–0–0 || 
|- align="center" 
|4||T||October 19, 2002||3–3 OT|| align="left"| @ Pittsburgh Penguins (2002–03) ||3–0–1–0 || 
|- align="center" bgcolor="#CCFFCC" 
|5||W||October 21, 2002||4–2 || align="left"| @ New York Rangers (2002–03) ||4–0–1–0 || 
|- align="center" 
|6||T||October 23, 2002||2–2 OT|| align="left"| @ Columbus Blue Jackets (2002–03) ||4–0–2–0 || 
|- align="center" bgcolor="#CCFFCC" 
|7||W||October 25, 2002||3–2 || align="left"|  Washington Capitals (2002–03) ||5–0–2–0 || 
|- align="center" bgcolor="#FFBBBB"
|8||L||October 26, 2002||1–5 || align="left"| @ New Jersey Devils (2002–03) ||5–1–2–0 || 
|- align="center" bgcolor="#CCFFCC" 
|9||W||October 28, 2002||6–1 || align="left"| @ Florida Panthers (2002–03) ||6–1–2–0 || 
|- align="center" bgcolor="#CCFFCC" 
|10||W||October 30, 2002||3–0 || align="left"|  New York Rangers (2002–03) ||7–1–2–0 || 
|-

|- align="center" bgcolor="#FFBBBB"
|11||L||November 1, 2002||2–3 || align="left"| @ Washington Capitals (2002–03) ||7–2–2–0 || 
|- align="center" bgcolor="#FFBBBB"
|12||L||November 2, 2002||3–5 || align="left"| @ Pittsburgh Penguins (2002–03) ||7–3–2–0 || 
|- align="center" bgcolor="#FFBBBB"
|13||L||November 5, 2002||3–4 || align="left"| @ Toronto Maple Leafs (2002–03) ||7–4–2–0 || 
|- align="center" bgcolor="#CCFFCC" 
|14||W||November 8, 2002||4–1 || align="left"|  Pittsburgh Penguins (2002–03) ||8–4–2–0 || 
|- align="center" bgcolor="#FF6F6F"
|15||OTL||November 9, 2002||2–3 OT|| align="left"|  Chicago Blackhawks (2002–03) ||8–4–2–1 || 
|- align="center" bgcolor="#CCFFCC" 
|16||W||November 11, 2002||4–2 || align="left"|  Phoenix Coyotes (2002–03) ||9–4–2–1 || 
|- align="center" bgcolor="#CCFFCC" 
|17||W||November 15, 2002||4–2 || align="left"|  San Jose Sharks (2002–03) ||10–4–2–1 || 
|- align="center" bgcolor="#CCFFCC" 
|18||W||November 17, 2002||2–1 OT|| align="left"| @ Carolina Hurricanes (2002–03) ||11–4–2–1 || 
|- align="center" bgcolor="#FFBBBB"
|19||L||November 19, 2002||2–3 || align="left"|  Philadelphia Flyers (2002–03) ||11–5–2–1 || 
|- align="center" bgcolor="#FFBBBB"
|20||L||November 21, 2002||2–7 || align="left"|  New York Islanders (2002–03) ||11–6–2–1 || 
|- align="center" bgcolor="#CCFFCC" 
|21||W||November 23, 2002||3–1 || align="left"| @ New Jersey Devils (2002–03) ||12–6–2–1 || 
|- align="center" 
|22||T||November 27, 2002||1–1 OT|| align="left"| @ Buffalo Sabres (2002–03) ||12–6–3–1 || 
|- align="center" bgcolor="#FFBBBB"
|23||L||November 29, 2002||3–5 || align="left"|  Vancouver Canucks (2002–03) ||12–7–3–1 || 
|-

|- align="center" bgcolor="#FFBBBB"
|24||L||December 1, 2002||3–4 || align="left"| @ New York Rangers (2002–03) ||12–8–3–1 || 
|- align="center" bgcolor="#FF6F6F"
|25||OTL||December 3, 2002||3–4 OT|| align="left"| @ Toronto Maple Leafs (2002–03) ||12–8–3–2 || 
|- align="center" bgcolor="#CCFFCC" 
|26||W||December 5, 2002||3–2 || align="left"|  Edmonton Oilers (2002–03) ||13–8–3–2 || 
|- align="center" bgcolor="#FF6F6F"
|27||OTL||December 7, 2002||2–3 OT|| align="left"| @ Boston Bruins (2002–03) ||13–8–3–3 || 
|- align="center" bgcolor="#FFBBBB"
|28||L||December 8, 2002||1–3 || align="left"| @ Chicago Blackhawks (2002–03) ||13–9–3–3 || 
|- align="center" bgcolor="#FFBBBB"
|29||L||December 10, 2002||3–5 || align="left"| @ Minnesota Wild (2002–03) ||13–10–3–3 || 
|- align="center" bgcolor="#CCFFCC" 
|30||W||December 12, 2002||3–2 || align="left"| @ Montreal Canadiens (2002–03) ||14–10–3–3 || 
|- align="center" bgcolor="#CCFFCC" 
|31||W||December 14, 2002||4–3 || align="left"|  New York Islanders (2002–03) ||15–10–3–3 || 
|- align="center" 
|32||T||December 18, 2002||1–1 OT|| align="left"| @ Carolina Hurricanes (2002–03) ||15–10–4–3 || 
|- align="center" bgcolor="#FFBBBB"
|33||L||December 19, 2002||1–2 || align="left"|  Toronto Maple Leafs (2002–03) ||15–11–4–3 || 
|- align="center" 
|34||T||December 21, 2002||2–2 OT|| align="left"|  Nashville Predators (2002–03) ||15–11–5–3 || 
|- align="center" bgcolor="#FFBBBB"
|35||L||December 23, 2002||0–3 || align="left"| @ Washington Capitals (2002–03) ||15–12–5–3 || 
|- align="center" bgcolor="#CCFFCC" 
|36||W||December 27, 2002||5–2 || align="left"|  Boston Bruins (2002–03) ||16–12–5–3 || 
|- align="center" bgcolor="#CCFFCC" 
|37||W||December 29, 2002||5–3 || align="left"|  New York Rangers (2002–03) ||17–12–5–3 || 
|- align="center" bgcolor="#FFBBBB"
|38||L||December 31, 2002||3–6 || align="left"|  Ottawa Senators (2002–03) ||17–13–5–3 || 
|-

|- align="center" bgcolor="#FFBBBB"
|39||L||January 2, 2003||1–4 || align="left"| @ Calgary Flames (2002–03) ||17–14–5–3 || 
|- align="center" bgcolor="#FFBBBB"
|40||L||January 4, 2003||1–5 || align="left"| @ St. Louis Blues (2002–03) ||17–15–5–3 || 
|- align="center" bgcolor="#CCFFCC" 
|41||W||January 7, 2003||1–0 || align="left"|  Detroit Red Wings (2002–03) ||18–15–5–3 || 
|- align="center" bgcolor="#FF6F6F"
|42||OTL||January 9, 2003||2–3 OT|| align="left"|  Atlanta Thrashers (2002–03) ||18–15–5–4 || 
|- align="center" 
|43||T||January 11, 2003||3–3 OT|| align="left"|  New Jersey Devils (2002–03) ||18–15–6–4 || 
|- align="center" bgcolor="#FFBBBB"
|44||L||January 14, 2003||0–7 || align="left"| @ Ottawa Senators (2002–03) ||18–16–6–4 || 
|- align="center" bgcolor="#FFBBBB"
|45||L||January 17, 2003||2–3 || align="left"|  Pittsburgh Penguins (2002–03) ||18–17–6–4 || 
|- align="center" bgcolor="#FFBBBB"
|46||L||January 18, 2003||2–3 || align="left"| @ Philadelphia Flyers (2002–03) ||18–18–6–4 || 
|- align="center" bgcolor="#CCFFCC" 
|47||W||January 20, 2003||6–2 || align="left"|  Ottawa Senators (2002–03) ||19–18–6–4 || 
|- align="center" 
|48||T||January 22, 2003||2–2 OT|| align="left"|  Montreal Canadiens (2002–03) ||19–18–7–4 || 
|- align="center" bgcolor="#CCFFCC" 
|49||W||January 24, 2003||4–1 || align="left"| @ Dallas Stars (2002–03) ||20–18–7–4 || 
|- align="center" bgcolor="#FFBBBB"
|50||L||January 25, 2003||2–3 || align="left"| @ Nashville Predators (2002–03) ||20–19–7–4 || 
|- align="center" bgcolor="#CCFFCC" 
|51||W||January 28, 2003||3–0 || align="left"| @ Philadelphia Flyers (2002–03) ||21–19–7–4 || 
|- align="center" bgcolor="#CCFFCC" 
|52||W||January 30, 2003||3–1 || align="left"|  Carolina Hurricanes (2002–03) ||22–19–7–4 || 
|-

|- align="center" bgcolor="#FFBBBB"
|53||L||February 4, 2003||1–5 || align="left"|  Washington Capitals (2002–03) ||22–20–7–4 || 
|- align="center" bgcolor="#FF6F6F"
|54||OTL||February 6, 2003||2–3 OT|| align="left"|  Toronto Maple Leafs (2002–03) ||22–20–7–5 || 
|- align="center" 
|55||T||February 8, 2003||4–4 OT|| align="left"| @ Florida Panthers (2002–03) ||22–20–8–5 || 
|- align="center" bgcolor="#FFBBBB"
|56||L||February 11, 2003||2–6 || align="left"| @ New York Islanders (2002–03) ||22–21–8–5 || 
|- align="center" 
|57||T||February 14, 2003||2–2 OT|| align="left"| @ Atlanta Thrashers (2002–03) ||22–21–9–5 || 
|- align="center" bgcolor="#CCFFCC" 
|58||W||February 15, 2003||5–2 || align="left"|  Boston Bruins (2002–03) ||23–21–9–5 || 
|- align="center" bgcolor="#CCFFCC" 
|59||W||February 17, 2003||3–1 || align="left"|  Washington Capitals (2002–03) ||24–21–9–5 || 
|- align="center" bgcolor="#CCFFCC" 
|60||W||February 19, 2003||2–0 || align="left"|  Atlanta Thrashers (2002–03) ||25–21–9–5 || 
|- align="center" 
|61||T||February 21, 2003||2–2 OT|| align="left"| @ Carolina Hurricanes (2002–03) ||25–21–10–5 || 
|- align="center" bgcolor="#FFBBBB"
|62||L||February 23, 2003||1–4 || align="left"|  Buffalo Sabres (2002–03) ||25–22–10–5 || 
|- align="center" bgcolor="#CCFFCC" 
|63||W||February 25, 2003||2–0 || align="left"|  Mighty Ducks of Anaheim (2002–03) ||26–22–10–5 || 
|- align="center" bgcolor="#CCFFCC" 
|64||W||February 27, 2003||3–1 || align="left"|  Florida Panthers (2002–03) ||27–22–10–5 || 
|-

|- align="center" bgcolor="#CCFFCC" 
|65||W||March 1, 2003||2–1 || align="left"| @ Ottawa Senators (2002–03) ||28–22–10–5 || 
|- align="center" bgcolor="#CCFFCC" 
|66||W||March 4, 2003||3–1 || align="left"| @ New York Islanders (2002–03) ||29–22–10–5 || 
|- align="center" bgcolor="#FFBBBB"
|67||L||March 5, 2003||2–3 || align="left"| @ Detroit Red Wings (2002–03) ||29–23–10–5 || 
|- align="center" bgcolor="#CCFFCC" 
|68||W||March 7, 2003||4–3 || align="left"|  Colorado Avalanche (2002–03) ||30–23–10–5 || 
|- align="center" 
|69||T||March 9, 2003||1–1 OT|| align="left"|  Buffalo Sabres (2002–03) ||30–23–11–5 || 
|- align="center" bgcolor="#CCFFCC" 
|70||W||March 12, 2003||4–2 || align="left"|  Los Angeles Kings (2002–03) ||31–23–11–5 || 
|- align="center" bgcolor="#CCFFCC" 
|71||W||March 14, 2003||4–2 || align="left"| @ Buffalo Sabres (2002–03) ||32–23–11–5 || 
|- align="center" bgcolor="#CCFFCC" 
|72||W||March 15, 2003||2–1 || align="left"| @ Montreal Canadiens (2002–03) ||33–23–11–5 || 
|- align="center" 
|73||T||March 17, 2003||3–3 OT|| align="left"|  Minnesota Wild (2002–03) ||33–23–12–5 || 
|- align="center" 
|74||T||March 20, 2003||2–2 OT|| align="left"| @ Los Angeles Kings (2002–03) ||33–23–13–5 || 
|- align="center" bgcolor="#CCFFCC" 
|75||W||March 22, 2003||4–0 || align="left"| @ Phoenix Coyotes (2002–03) ||34–23–13–5 || 
|- align="center" bgcolor="#CCFFCC" 
|76||W||March 24, 2003||4–1 || align="left"| @ San Jose Sharks (2002–03) ||35–23–13–5 || 
|- align="center" 
|77||T||March 27, 2003||2–2 OT|| align="left"|  New Jersey Devils (2002–03) ||35–23–14–5 || 
|- align="center" 
|78||T||March 29, 2003||1–1 OT|| align="left"|  Florida Panthers (2002–03) ||35–23–15–5 || 
|- align="center" 
|79||T||March 31, 2003||2–2 OT|| align="left"| @ Boston Bruins (2002–03) ||35–23–16–5 || 
|-

|- align="center" bgcolor="#CCFFCC" 
|80||W||April 2, 2003||2–1 || align="left"|  Montreal Canadiens (2002–03) ||36–23–16–5 || 
|- align="center" bgcolor="#FFBBBB"
|81||L||April 4, 2003||1–4 || align="left"|  Philadelphia Flyers (2002–03) ||36–24–16–5 || 
|- align="center" bgcolor="#FFBBBB"
|82||L||April 6, 2003||2–6 || align="left"| @ Atlanta Thrashers (2002–03) ||36–25–16–5 || 
|-

|-
| Lightning score listed first;

Playoffs

|- align="center" bgcolor="#FFCCCC"
| 1 ||L|| April 10, 2003 || Washington Capitals || 0–3 || Capitals lead 1–0 || 
|- align="center" bgcolor="#FFCCCC"
| 2 ||L|| April 12, 2003 || Washington Capitals || 3–6 || Capitals lead 2–0 || 
|- align="center" bgcolor="#CCFFCC"
| 3 ||W|| April 15, 2003 || @ Washington Capitals || 4–3 OT || Capitals lead 2–1 || 
|- align="center" bgcolor="#CCFFCC"
| 4 ||W|| April 16, 2003 || @ Washington Capitals || 3–1 || Series tied 2–2 || 
|- align="center" bgcolor="#CCFFCC"
| 5 ||W|| April 18, 2003 || Washington Capitals || 2–1 || Lightning lead 3–2 || 
|- align="center" bgcolor="#CCFFCC"
| 6 ||W|| April 20, 2003 || @ Washington Capitals || 2–1 3OT || Lightning win 4–2 || 
|-

|- align="center" bgcolor="#FFCCCC"
| 1 ||L|| April 24, 2003 || @ New Jersey Devils || 0–3 || Devils lead 1–0 || 
|- align="center" bgcolor="#FFCCCC"
| 2 ||L|| April 26, 2003 || @ New Jersey Devils || 2–3 OT || Devils lead 2–0 || 
|- align="center" bgcolor="#CCFFCC"
| 3 ||W|| April 28, 2003 || New Jersey Devils || 4–3 || Devils lead 2–1 || 
|- align="center" bgcolor="#FFCCCC"
| 4 ||L|| April 30, 2003 || New Jersey Devils || 1–3 || Devils lead 3–1 || 
|- align="center" bgcolor="#FFCCCC"
| 5 ||L|| May 2, 2003 || @ New Jersey Devils || 1–2 3OT || Devils win 4–1 || 
|-

|-
| Lightning score listed first;

Player statistics

Scoring
 Position abbreviations: C = Center; D = Defense; G = Goaltender; LW = Left Wing; RW = Right Wing
  = Joined team via a transaction (e.g., trade, waivers, signing) during the season. Stats reflect time with the Lightning only.
  = Left team via a transaction (e.g., trade, waivers, release) during the season. Stats reflect time with the Lightning only.

Goaltending

Awards and records

Awards

Transactions
The Lightning were involved in the following transactions from June 14, 2002, the day after the deciding game of the 2002 Stanley Cup Finals, through June 9, 2003, the day of the deciding game of the 2003 Stanley Cup Finals.

Trades

Players acquired

Players lost

Signings

Draft picks
Tampa Bay's draft picks at the 2002 NHL Entry Draft held at the Air Canada Centre in Toronto, Ontario.

See also
2002–03 NHL season

Notes

References

Tam
Tam
Tampa Bay Lightning seasons
Tamp
Tamp